Street Fighter: The Legend of Chun-Li is a 2009 American crime film released as a non-canon spin-off and theatrical tie-in to Street Fighter IV. It follows the quest of Street Fighter character Chun-Li, who is portrayed by Kristin Kreuk. Its story is before the events of the original Street Fighter as it follows Chun-Li's personal history and her journey for justice. The film co-stars Neal McDonough as M. Bison, Chris Klein as Charlie, Michael Clarke Duncan as Balrog, and Black Eyed Peas member Taboo as Vega. The Legend of Chun-Li was produced by Capcom and Hyde Park Entertainment and was released on February 27, 2009 by 20th Century Fox to mostly negative reviews and poor box office numbers.

Plot

Chun-Li moves from San Francisco to Hong Kong with her family. While practicing to be a concert pianist, she learns wushu from her father, businessman Xiang. The family lives a normal life until they are attacked one night by thugs working for the criminal organization Shadaloo, with Xiang being abducted in front of Chun-Li. Chun-Li grows up and becomes a talented pianist. At the end of her concert, she receives a mysterious scroll written in ancient Chinese text. Shortly after, she loses her mother to cancer. Meanwhile, at Shadaloo headquarters in Bangkok, Thailand, crime boss M.Bison announces his complete control of the organization before he has the other shareholders executed by one of his henchmen, Vega. It is also revealed that Xiang is still alive and working for him.

The next day, Royal Thai Police detective Maya Sunee meets Interpol agent Charlie Nash, when both are called to investigate the murder of several crime syndicate families in Bangkok, with Nash determining Shadaloo perpetrated these crimes. In Hong Kong, an elderly woman translates Chun-Li's scroll and tells her to travel to Bangkok and find a man named Gen. Chun-Li then leaves her home and travels to Bangkok, living homeless and searching for Gen for several days. A fight with local gangsters one night leaves her unconscious, and Gen appears and takes her to his home. Gen tells Chun-Li that he was once a comrade of Bison, and knows how to find her father. For the next few days, he teaches her his style of martial arts. Chun-Li also learns more about Bison, who is operating Shadaloo publicly, and is holding the families of property owners hostage in order to force them to sign their property over to him. While spying on Bison's henchman Balrog, she overhears a property owner being asked to hand over the rights to a docking harbor, allowing the shipment of the "White Rose".

Later that night, Chun-Li confronts Cantana, one of Bison's secretaries, in a nightclub. She obtains information on the location of the White Rose before escaping from Shadaloo's thugs and Nash and Maya. As a result of this incident, Cantana is murdered the next morning by Bison. During lunch, Gen reveals more of Bison's past; he was born in Bangkok to Irish missionaries but abandoned as an infant, grew up an orphan and lived his life as a thief. He killed his pregnant wife and transferred his conscience into their prematurely born daughter. After telling Chun-Li to go and fetch some food, Gen is attacked by Shadaloo troops and Balrog blows up his house. Chun-Li runs off when she is attacked by Vega, whom she defeats and leaves hanging by the side of a building.

Chun-Li interrogates a harbor employee who tells her the arrival time of the White Rose. She returns to the shipping yard that night, but is captured by Bison and his soldiers. Tied up and taken into an undisclosed house, she is reunited with Xiang, only for Bison to murder him. After Bison and Balrog leave the house, Chun-Li uses her skills to defeat the guards and escape, during which she is shot in the arm while trying to protect a child. Angered Thai locals then pelt Balrog and other Shadaloo henchmen with fruits, food, and other merchandise. Chun-Li is reunited with Gen, who heals her wounds and continues with her training.

Despite being taken off the assignment, Nash is secretly asked by Chun-Li to back her up in taking down Bison. Nash and Chun-Li, along with Maya and her SWAT team, arrive at the shipping yard, where they engage in a shootout with Shadaloo forces. Chun-Li enters a ship and meets a Russian-speaking girl who asks for her father before leaving her to continue her search for Bison. In another part of the ship Gen faces off against Balrog, ultimately impaling him with a liquid nitrogen pipe. Bison takes the girl, who is revealed to be his daughter Rose, and flees the scene by helicopter. Chun-Li, Gen, Nash and a SWAT officer arrive at Bison's headquarters, where Nash and the officer take Rose out to safety while Chun-Li and Gen face Bison. After a long battle, Chun-Li hits Bison with a bamboo pole and drops sandbags on him, stunning him. She then charges up a Kikoken and shoots it at him, knocking him off the scaffolding before she jumps and twists his neck with her legs. Nash tells Chun-Li to leave the scene as Thai police arrive.

Chun-Li returns to her home in Hong Kong and settles down, then Gen pays her a visit. He shows her a newspaper advert for an upcoming Street Fighter tournament, telling her that a Japanese fighter named Ryu might be a recruit for their cause. She declines the offer, telling him she is home for now.

Cast
 Kristin Kreuk as Chun-Li
Katherine Pemberton as Young Chun-Li
 Neal McDonough as M. Bison
Brendan Miller as Young M. Bison
 Chris Klein as Interpol Agent Charlie Nash
 Michael Clarke Duncan as Balrog
 Moon Bloodgood as Detective Maya Sunee
 Taboo as Vega
 Robin Shou as Gen, Martial Arts Master
 Edmund Chen as Huang Xiang, Father of Chun-Li
 Josie Ho as Cantana
 Elizaveta Kiryukhina as Rose
 Cheng Pei-pei as Zhilan

Production
In 2006, Hyde Park Entertainment and Capcom announced its intention to produce a film adaptation of the game series in a joint venture under the 20th Century Fox banner, with the storyline to focus on a Street Fighter origin story starting with one of its characters Chun-Li with screenwriter Justin Marks to write a script for the adaptation. In 2007, Hype Park has chosen Andrzej Bartkowiak to helm as film director. That same year, it was announced that Kristin Kreuk was cast as Chun-Li.

In 2008, Michael Clarke Duncan, Chris Klein, Taboo, Rick Yune and Neal McDonough were cast as characters Balrog, Charlie Nash, Vega, Gen and M. Bison with Moon Bloodgood, Edmund Chen, Josie Ho and Cheng Pei-pei were also cast in roles as well. In the interview with MTV, Jean-Claude Van Damme who played Guile in the 1994 film revealed that he was offered to reprise his role but turned down the movie. Before shooting began Yune left the film for unknown reasons but was replaced by Robin Shou, who played Liu Kang, the lead character in the Mortal Kombat films as Gen.

Filming took place between March and April 2008. Shooting locations included Hong Kong, China; Bangkok, Thailand; Vancouver, Canada; and Reno, Nevada and Herlong, California, United States.

Release
Originally it was slated to be released to theatres sometime in Fall 2008 release, but because of the ongoing writers strike at the time and because of more time with filming, the film was released in theatres in the United States on February 27, 2009. In Australia, the film did not receive a theatrical release, but a straight-to-DVD release instead on January 14, 2010.

Box office performance
The film opened theatrically on its opening weekend on February 27, 2009 alongside Jonas Brothers: The 3D Concert Experience and Madea Goes to Jail (the latter on its second weekend). The film opened at #9 on its opening weekend at over $1.5 million. The film flopped at the box office, grossing $12.8 million worldwide against its $50 million budget.

Home media
The film was released on home media on DVD and Blu-ray on June 30, 2009. with a Unrated/PG-13 version. The special First Run release included a bonus DVD of the Udon Street Fighter Comic Series: "Round One FIGHT."

The film performed at #9 at the American DVD sales chart, selling 92,830 units in the first weekend. About 258,000 DVD units have been sold so far in the United States, bringing in revenue of $4.7m. This figure does not include DVD rentals/Blu-ray sales.

Reception

Street Fighter: The Legend of Chun-Li, like the previous live-action film Street Fighter, received mostly negative reviews and was not pre-screened for critics. Review aggregation website Rotten Tomatoes gives the film a rating of  based on  reviews. It was ranked 44th in Rotten Tomatoes' 100 worst reviewed films of the 2000s, with the critical consensus "The combination of a shallow plot and miscast performers renders Street Fighter: The Legend of Chun Li a perfectly forgettable video game adaptation." At Metacritic, which assigns a normalized rating out of 100 to reviews from mainstream critics, the film has received an average score of 17, based on 11 reviews.

Film historian Leonard Maltin seemed to agree, stating that "The 1994 picture was one of the worst movies ever inspired by a video game; even Jean-Claude Van Damme fans couldn't rationalize this turkey, which should have been titled Four Hundred Funerals and No Sex. Yet this pointless and inept action vehicle makes its predecessor seem like Gone with the Wind...Hopelessly contrived, with lamely-choreographed fight sequences; highlight is Chris Klein's cry of 'Bomb! Get out, now!' Our sentiments exactly."

Among the film's more positive reviews, Rob Nelson of Variety wrote: "Neither the best nor the worst of movies derived from video games, Street Fighter: The Legend of Chun-Li at least gives action fans plenty to ogle besides the titular heroine (Kristin Kreuk)." Jeannette Catsoulis of The New York Times wrote that the film was "reveling in the vivid Bangkok locations, Geoff Boyle's photography is crisp and bright, and Dion Lam's action choreography unusually witty."

Negative reviews focused on the screenplay and fight scenes. Frank Scheck of The Hollywood Reporter wrote that "other than a few reasonably well-staged fight sequences, the proceedings are dull and visually uninspired. Justin Marks' solemn screenplay lacks any trace of wit."Jeremy Wheeler of TV Guide wrote: "Fight scenes, while admirable for shaking off the shaky-cam aesthetic of their big-screen brethren, neither inspire nor find a good balance between martial arts and FX-laden power punches." Jim Vejvoda of IGN gave the film 1.5 stars out of 5, writing: "There's better staged and more enjoyable brawls between Peter and The Chicken on Family Guy." Ryan Davis of Giant Bomb described it as "a re-envisioning [of the source material] by people who can't see."

See also

 List of films based on video games

References

External links
 
 
 
 
 
 
 Production Blog

2009 films
2000s crime films
2000s English-language films
Gangster films
2009 martial arts films
20th Century Fox films
Live-action films based on video games
Films directed by Andrzej Bartkowiak
Films set in Hong Kong
Films set in San Francisco
Films set in Thailand
Films shot in Hong Kong
Films shot in Thailand
Films shot in Vancouver
Reboot films
Street Fighter films
2000s American films